The 1937 South American Championship Final was the final match to determine the winner of the 1937 South American Championship, the 14th edition of this continental competition. It was held on February 1, 1937, in San Lorenzo de Almagro's venue, Estadio Gasómetro of Buenos Aires. Because of the heat (the tournament was played in Summer), most of the matches were played at night (Estadio Gasómetro was the only stadium in Argentina with artificial lighting by then) while other games were played at daytime (being held in River Plate's venue, Estadio Alvear y Tagle.

Argentina won the match against Brazil by a 2-0 score, winning its fifth continental title.

Qualified teams

Route to the final 

Notes
 Argentina an Brazil finished tied on points so a playoff match had to be played to decide the champion.

Overview 
Brazil had attended the competition without two of their most notable players, defender Domingos da Guia (champion with Boca Juniors two years before) and striker Leonidas da Silva, nicknamed the Black Diamond. The tournament was played in a single round-robin system, but Argentina and Brazil finished tied on points, meaning a playoff match was required to determine a champion, according to the rules in force.

The match was held in San Lorenzo stadium, were both teams played hard, committing several number of fouls. After Brazilian player Domingos Spitalletti kicked Francisco Varallo violently in the 36th minute, a riot involving all the players (even some substitutes) started. After a hiatus of 40', the match restarted. Nevertheless, just two minutes a new riot happened after Cunha hit Cherro on his face. 

For the second half Carlos Peucelle replaced Cherro and veteran Bernabé Ferreyra substituted Zozaya. 19-year-old 
Independiente forward Vicente de la Mata replaced Varallo, who had been injured; De la Mata had played in the loss to Uruguay, and had a poor performance.

As the score was tied 0–0 when 90 minutes expired, two 15-minute halves of extra time were required to determine the champion: during the extra time, de la Mata scored two goals within four minutes, allowing Argentina to win its fifth South American championship. 

The match ended at almost 2 a.m. in Buenos Aires.

Match details

Aftermath
Some journalist consider this match the beginning of the Argentina–Brazil football rivalry. This tournament was also the closure of an era with the Argentine squad for some of the most notable players such as Enrique Guaita, Alberto Zozaya, Alejandro Scopelli, Bernabé Ferreyra, Carlos Peucelle and Francisco Varallo.

References

1937 South American Championship
1937
1937
Copa América finals
Football in Buenos Aires
Sports competitions in Buenos Aires
Argentina–Brazil football rivalry at Copa América
February 1937 sports events